The Federated Football Association of Masbate is a Filipino football association based in Masbate. It works under the Philippine Football Federation as provincial football association for the region. The FA of Masbate sends a team to represent the region in the yearly PFF National Men's Club Championship.

1991 establishments in the Philippines
Masbate Football Association
Sports organizations established in 1991
Football Association of Masbate